James C. Holland (1853–1919), commonly known as J.C. Holland, was an architect in the U.S. state of Kansas.

The firm also operated as J.C. Holland and Son.

Biography
He was born April 2, 1853, in a log cabin in Lima, Ohio.  He worked as an architect in Kansas for more than 30 years.  He served as state architect for a period of time. In 1882, Holland married Lizzie Baker, with whom he had a son Franklin and a daughter Lydia. In 1883-1884 he was chair of the architecture department of Ohio Northern University, his alma mater. He died on May 28, 1919, in Topeka, Kansas.

Under various punctuations or spellings for his name, and/or with various partners, many of his works are listed on the National Register of Historic Places.

Projects
J.C. Holland's or the firm's works include (with attribution):
Atchison, Topeka and Santa Fe Railway Depot, E. Wyatt Earp Blvd., Dodge City, KS (Holland, J.C.), NRHP-listed
Burr Oak School, 776 Kansas, Burr Oak, KS (Holland, J.C.), NRHP-listed
Burr Oak United Methodist Church, NE corner Pennsylvania & Washington Sts., Burr Oak, KS (Holland, J.C.), NRHP-listed
Clay County Courthouse, 5th and Court Sts., Clay Center, KS (Holland,J.C.), NRHP-listed
One or more works in Downtown Manhattan Historic District, generally including the blocks between Humboldt and Pierre Streets from 3rd to 5th Sts., Manhattan, KS (Holland, J.C.), NRHP-listed
One or more works in Fairbury Commercial Historic District, roughly bounded by 6th, F, 3rd, and B Sts., and RR tracks, Fairbury, NE (HOLLAND, J.C.), NRHP-listed
Jefferson County Courthouse, Courthouse Sq., Fairbury, NE (Holland,J. C.), NRHP-listed
Jewell County Jail, Jct. of Center and Madison, NE corner, Mankato, KS (Holland, James C.), NRHP-listed
Marion County Courthouse, 3rd and Williams Sts., Marion, KS (Holland,J.C.), NRHP-listed
Mitchell County Courthouse, Main St. and Hersey Ave., Beloit, KS (Holland,J.C.), NRHP-listed
Ness County Bank, Main St. and Pennsylvania Ave., Ness City, KS (Holland & Hopkins), NRHP-listed
Old Junction City High School, Adams and 6th Sts., Junction City, KS (Holland & Squires), NRHP-listed
Osborne County Courthouse, 423 W. Main St., Osborne, KS (Holland, J.C. & Squires), NRHP-listed
Rice County Courthouse, 101 W. Commercial St., Lyons, KS (J.C. Holland and Son), NRHP-listed
Riley County Courthouse, 100 Courthouse Plaza, Manhattan, KS (Holland, J.C. & F.C. Squires), NRHP-listed
Thomas County Courthouse, 300 N. Court, Colby, KS (Holland,J.C. & Squires, Frank), NRHP-listed
Washington County Jail and Sheriff's Residence, 23 Commercial St., Washington, KS (Holland, James C.), NRHP-listed

References

1853 births
1919 deaths
19th-century American architects
Architects from Kansas
Ohio Northern University alumni
Ohio Northern University faculty
20th-century American architects